Bani Al-Fakher is a sub-district located in Hazm al-'Udayn District, Ibb Governorate, Yemen. Bani Al-Fakher had a population of 2721 according to the 2004 census.

References 

Sub-districts in Hazm al-'Udayn District